Ristomatti Hakola (born 15 April 1991) is a Finnish cross-country skier.

He represented Finland at the FIS Nordic World Ski Championships 2015 in Falun and at the FIS Nordic World Ski Championships 2017 in Lahti where he finished sixth in the sprint competition.

Cross-country skiing results
All results are sourced from the International Ski Federation (FIS).

Olympic Games

Distance reduced to 30 km due to weather conditions.

World Championships
2 medals – (2 silver)

World Cup

Season standings

Team podiums
3 podiums  – (1 , 2 )

References

External links

1991 births
Living people
Finnish male cross-country skiers
Cross-country skiers at the 2018 Winter Olympics
Cross-country skiers at the 2022 Winter Olympics
Olympic cross-country skiers of Finland
FIS Nordic World Ski Championships medalists in cross-country skiing
People from Kankaanpää
Sportspeople from Satakunta
21st-century Finnish people